Châteauvieux is a commune in the Var département in the Provence-Alpes-Côte d'Azur region, southeastern France.  It is located in the Vallon des Bous, on the D52 road, 17 km south east of Castellane.

See also
Communes of the Var department

References

Communes of Var (department)